Joan Mondale (née Adams; August 8, 1930 – February 3, 2014) was the second lady of the United States from 1977 until 1981 as the wife of Walter Mondale, the 42nd vice president of the United States. She was an artist and author and served on the boards of several organizations. For her promotion of the arts, she was affectionately dubbed Joan of Art.

Family and education 
Joan Adams was born on August 8, 1930, in Eugene, Oregon, one of three daughters of the Rev. John Maxwell Adams, a Presbyterian minister, and his wife, the former Eleanor Jane Hall. She attended Media Friends School, an integrated Quaker school in Media, Pennsylvania; a public school in Columbus, Ohio; and later St. Paul Academy and Summit School in St. Paul, Minnesota. In 1952, she graduated from Macalester College in St. Paul, where her father served as chaplain, with a bachelor's degree in history. Following graduation from college, she worked at the Boston Museum of Fine Arts and the Minneapolis Institute of Art.
 
On December 27, 1955, Joan married Minneapolis lawyer Walter "Fritz" Mondale, whom she had met on a blind date.

The couple had three children: 
  Ted Mondale (b. October 12, 1957), Minnesota politician, former State Senator, and candidate for Governor of Minnesota in 1998.
  Eleanor Jane Mondale Poling (January 19, 1960 – September 17, 2011), television and radio personality who died of brain cancer at 51
  William Hall Mondale (b. February 27, 1962), Assistant Attorney General, Office of the Minnesota Attorney General (1990–2000)

Political life 

In 1964, Walter Mondale replaced Hubert Humphrey as a U.S. Senator, serving until 1976, when Democratic presidential candidate Jimmy Carter selected him as his running-mate in his successful bid for the Presidency.

Joan Mondale then became Second Lady, succeeding Happy Rockefeller, during her husband's term as vice president from 1977 to 1981, and was succeeded by Barbara Bush. 

Joan Mondale was a supporter of the Equal Rights Amendment and often lended her support publicly to the cause.

Out of office during Ronald Reagan's first term as president, Walter Mondale won the Democratic presidential nomination in 1984. As a prospective First Lady, Joan Mondale told Maureen Dowd of The New York Times that she would not talk about recipes or clothes during the campaign, but when her husband's political opponents took issue with this, costing him votes, she published The Mondale Family Cookbook, with recipes including Fettucine à la Pimento Mondale, and declared that she was a "traditional wife and mother and supporter".

Walter Mondale lost the election, and the Mondales returned to Minnesota, where they lived until his term as U.S. Ambassador to Japan from 1993 to 1996, after which he resumed his Minneapolis-based law practice.

Joan of Art 

Joan Mondale was a lifelong practitioner, patron, and advocate of the arts, and her nickname 'Joan of Art' was a sincere tribute.

An accomplished potter, she studied art at college, and then worked in galleries, before moving to Washington as a Senator's wife in 1964, and led guided tours at the National Gallery of Art. In 1972, she wrote a book Politics in Art, examining how political commentary is reflected in artworks. Later she regularly gave tours as a guide for friend Ellen Proxmire (the then wife of Wisconsin Democratic Senator William Proxmire)'s company whirl-around.

Later, as Second Lady, she turned the Vice Presidential Mansion into a showcase of American art, with works by artists including Robert Rauschenberg, Edward Hopper, Louise Nevelson, and Ansel Adams. At this time, she also served as chairperson of the Federal Council on the Arts and Humanities.

As the U.S. Ambassador's wife in Japan, she enthusiastically promoted inter-cultural understanding through art, redecorating the Embassy with American paintings and organising tours with a bi-lingual guide. She studied Japanese art, and impressed the Mayor of Kyoto by presenting him with a ceramic bowl she had made herself in the traditional Mashiko style.

She was the author of Letters From Japan, a collection of essays about life overseas published in 1998.

Back in Minnesota, Mondale continued to make her own pottery and promote the arts. She served on the boards of the Minnesota Orchestra, Walker Art Center, Macalester College and the National Portrait Gallery. In 2004, the Textile Center in Minneapolis endowed an exhibition space in her honor, the Joan Mondale Gallery.

She also served as a member of the Postmaster General's Citizens' Stamp Advisory Committee, serving in that position from       2005 to 2010.

Death
On February 2, 2014, Mondale's family announced that she had entered hospice care due to Alzheimer's disease. She died at a care facility in Minneapolis the following day, at age 83. Her remains were cremated.

Books

References

External links

1930 births
2014 deaths
Artists from Eugene, Oregon
Artists from Minneapolis
Deaths from dementia in Minnesota
Deaths from Alzheimer's disease
Macalester College alumni
Minnesota Democrats
Presbyterians from Minnesota
Writers from Eugene, Oregon
Writers from Minneapolis
Second ladies of the United States
Spouses of Minnesota politicians
Walter Mondale
Equal Rights Amendment activists